Aerovanguardia  is a defunct airline founded in 1993 in Colombia. The company had a total of 6 airplanes in the entirety of its history. The company out of all 6 of those airplanes, crashed 3 of them in Colombia. When the company became bankrupt because of its airplanes getting destroyed, it sold 2 of its airplanes to Aliansa and ADES. The only surviving two aircraft were stored at La Vanguardia Airport. Then the company went bankrupt in 2007.

See also
 La Vanguardia Airport
 List of airlines of Colombia
 List of defunct airlines of Colombia

References

External links

Defunct airlines of Colombia
Airlines established in 1993
Airlines disestablished in 2007
Defunct companies of Colombia